Gustav Tannenberger (born 8 June 1953) is a Czech gymnast. He competed in eight events at the 1976 Summer Olympics.

References

External links
 

1953 births
Living people
Czech male artistic gymnasts
Olympic gymnasts of Czechoslovakia
Gymnasts at the 1976 Summer Olympics
People from Vyškov
Sportspeople from the South Moravian Region